Charlotte Jones may refer to:

 Charlotte Jones (writer) (born 1968), British playwright and actress
 Charlotte Jones (painter) (1768–1847), miniature painter to Princess Charlotte
 Charlotte Jones (comics), fictional character (a latent mutant in the Marvel Comics Universe)
 Alex Jones (Welsh presenter) (Charlotte Alexandra Jones, born 1977), Welsh television presenter